Saint Vincent and the Grenadines competed at the 2004 Summer Olympics in Athens, Greece from 13 to 29 August 2004.

Athletics

Athletes from Saint Vincent and the Grenadines have so far achieved qualifying standards in the following athletics events (up to a maximum of 3 athletes in each event at the 'A' Standard, and 1 at the 'B' Standard):

Natasha Mayers was the slowest qualifier in the 100 metres, before being forced to abandon the competition at the second round, while Andy Grant avoided the infamy of placing last in the men's 800 metres by only 3 seconds.

Men

Women

Key
Note–Ranks given for track events are within the athlete's heat only
Q = Qualified for the next round
q = Qualified for the next round as a fastest loser or, in field events, by position without achieving the qualifying target
NR = National record
N/A = Round not applicable for the event
Bye = Athlete not required to compete in round

Swimming

Men

See also
 Saint Vincent and the Grenadines at the 2002 Commonwealth Games
 Saint Vincent and the Grenadines at the 2003 Pan American Games
 Saint Vincent and the Grenadines at the 2006 Commonwealth Games

References

External links
Official Report of the XXVIII Olympiad
SVG Olympic Committee

Nations at the 2004 Summer Olympics
2004
Olympics